Punaluu (pronounced ) is a census-designated place and rural community in the Koolauloa District on the island of Oahu, City & County of Honolulu, Hawaii, United States. In Hawaiian, punaluu means "coral dived for", or in the case of the fishpond once located here, possibly "spring dived for". There is a very small commercial center located beside Punaluu Stream, and several condominium projects, including a high-rise building, located at Haleaha Beach and Kaluanui Beach. At the 2020 census, the CDP had a population of 1,374.

A fringing reef extends off the shoreline. There are several beaches and a beach park in Punaluu, including Punaluu Beach Park, Punaluu Beach, Haleaha Beach, and Kaluanui Beach. Sugar cane was once grown on the narrow coastal plain inland from the highway.

The U.S. postal code for Punaluu is 96717.

Geography 

Punaluu is located at 21°35'33" North, 157°53'49" West (21.592600, -157.896989). The town is north of Kahana Bay and Kaaawa and south of Hauula along Kamehameha Highway (State Rte. 83). Kaluanui Stream and Sacred Falls are located between Punaluu and Hauula.

Demographics 

As of the census of 2000, there were 881 people, 305 households, and 196 families residing in the CDP. The racial makeup of the CDP was 32.69% White, 0.57% Black or African American, 0.23% Native American, 10.22% Asian, 24.06% Pacific Islander, 0.23% from other races, and 32.01% from two or more races.  6.02% of the population were Hispanic or Latino of any race.

There were 305 households, out of which 34.1% had children under the age of 18 living with them, 44.3% were married couples living together, 13.4% had a female householder with no husband present, and 35.7% were non-families. 29.8% of all households were made up of individuals, and 5.2% had someone living alone who was 65 years of age or older.  The average household size was 2.66 and the average family size was 3.32.

In the CDP the population was spread out, with 26.0% under the age of 18, 8.7% from 18 to 24, 24.3% from 25 to 44, 25.0% from 45 to 64, and 16.0% who were 65 years of age or older.  The median age was 38 years.  For every 100 females, there were 94.5 males.  For every 100 females age 18 and over, there were 88.4 males.

The median income for a household in the CDP was $32,143, and the median income for a family was $32,500. Males had a median income of $32,188 versus $21,719 for females. The per capita income for the CDP was $19,067.  About 15.8% of families and 19.9% of the population were below the poverty line, including 24.5% of those under the age of 18 and 0.8% of those ages 65 and older.

References

Census-designated places in Honolulu County, Hawaii
Populated places on Oahu
Populated coastal places in Hawaii